Ussuniidae is a  monogeneric family of Ordovician brachiopods aligned with the Trimerellids, but showing additional similarities to the craniids and considered intermediate in morphology.

References

Craniata
Prehistoric brachiopods